Claoxylopsis is a plant genus of the family Euphorbiaceae, first described as a genus in 1939. The entire genus is endemic to Madagascar.

Species
 Claoxylopsis andapensis Radcl.-Sm.
 Claoxylopsis perrieri Leandri
 Claoxylopsis purpurascens Radcl.-Sm.

References

Acalypheae
Endemic flora of Madagascar
Euphorbiaceae genera